Charles Simpson may refer to:

 Charles Simpson (politician) (1887–1963), Australian politician
 Charles Simpson (cricketer) (1882-1956), Australian cricketer
 Charles Ralph Simpson III (born 1945), United States federal judge
 Charles R. Simpson (Tax Court judge) a United States Tax Court judge
 Charles Torrey Simpson (1846–1932), American biologist
 Charles Walter Simpson (Canadian artist) (1878–1942)
 Charles Walter Simpson (English artist) (1885–1971)
 Charlie Simpson (born 1985), English popstar
 Charlie Simpson (footballer) (1861–?), English soccer player
 Charlie Simpson (fundraiser), seven-year-old British boy who raised over £150,000 ($241,000) for the 2010 Haiti earthquake relief efforts

See also
Charles S. Simpson House, Davenport, Iowa